Christian Hospital Serkawn ("Serkawn Hospital") is a hospital-cum-nursing school at Serkawn, Lunglei, Mizoram, India, operated by the Baptist Church of Mizoram. Started in 1919, and formally established in 1923, it was the first hospital and nursing school in Mizoram. It has a registered capacity of 100 beds.

History
Medical work at Christian Hospital Serkawn started in 1919, with the arrival of Miss E.O. Dicks (Pi Dawki), A missionary nurse from the Baptist Missionary Society (BMS), London. She started operating a dispensary at her residence. A separate building was constructed and was officially inaugurated on 10 February 1923. Initially, the hospital had a capacity of 30 beds for women and children. In 1957 the BMS deputed Dr. H.G. Stockley (Dr Zomuana) and his wife, also experienced in health-care, as  first resident doctor serving the community at Serkawn. Nursing school was started in 1952, with a course in auxiliary nurse mid-wifery (ANM), under the tutorship of Miss E.M. Maltby (Pi Zohnuni), who was then the nursing superintendent. In 1964, Dr C. Silvera became the first Mizo doctor and first Medical Superintendent of the hospital.

Facility
It has four main departments with  medical, surgical, paediatrics, and obstetrics and gynaecology. It also runs a daily clinic in the nearby town, as well as occasional health outreach to distant villages or school check-ups. There is a nursing school attached to the hospital, with approximately 70 students. The hospital also helps run a local orphanage of about 20-30 children.

References

External links

Buildings and structures in Mizoram
Hospital buildings completed in 1923
Lunglei
Hospitals in Mizoram
Christian hospitals
1919 establishments in India
20th-century architecture in India